Isabel Cool (born 17 September 1985) is a Belgian equestrian athlete. She competed at the 2018 FEI World Equestrian Games and at the European Dressage Championships in 2019.

References

1985 births
Living people
Belgian female equestrians
Belgian dressage riders